The men's 500 metres competition at the 2022 European Speed Skating Championships was held on 9 January 2022.

Results
The race was started at 16:05.

References

Men's 500 metres